Yavvanam Katesindi is a 1976 Telugu-language drama film directed by Dasari Narayana Rao and produced by Vijaya Bapineedu. The film stars Krishnam Raju, Jayachitra and Murali Mohan. The music was composed by Chakravarthy. It is a  remake of 1975 Tamil film Mayangukiral Oru Maadhu.

Plot

Cast 
 Krishnam Raju
 Jayachitra
 Murali Mohan
 Gummadi

Production 
After Vijaya Bapineedu acquired the rights to remake the 1975 Tamil film Mayangukiral Oru Maadhu in Telugu, he wanted Chedina Aadadi to be the title of the remake. P. Pullayya, who was a member of Central Board of Film Certification, did not accept the title, so Bapineedu went for Yavvanam Katesindi.

Soundtrack 
The music was composed by Chakravarthy.

Reception 
Yavvanam Katesindi was released on 23 January 1976, and emerged a success.

References

External links 

1970s Telugu-language films
1976 films
Films directed by Dasari Narayana Rao
Films scored by K. Chakravarthy
Indian drama films
Telugu remakes of Tamil films